This is a list of squads named for the seventh edition of Cricket World Cup (2003 Cricket World Cup), held in South Africa, Zimbabwe and Kenya between 9 February and 23 March 2003. The tournament saw 14 teams selected and placed in two groups. Each country was required to submit a final list of 15 players by 31 December 2002. An injured player could be replaced at any time up until the end of the tournament. Replacement players who were not in the original 15-man squad are indicated in italics. The oldest player at the 2003 Cricket World Cup was Lennie Louw (43) of Namibia while the youngest was Talha Jubair (17) of Bangladesh.

Group A

Australia
Australia announced its squad for the 2003 World Cup on 31 December 2002. Australia made three replacements in the squad – Ian Harvey replacing Shane Watson on 25 January 2003, Nathan Hauritz replacing Shane Warne on 24 February 2003, and Nathan Bracken replacing Jason Gillespie on 5 March 2003.
Coach: John Buchanan

England
The English squad for the 2003 Cricket World Cup was announced on 31 December 2002.Coach: Duncan Fletcher

India
The India squad for the tournament was announced on 30 December 2002.Coach: John Wright

Namibia
Coach: Dougie Brown

 Johannes van der Merwe replaced Riaan Walters on 28 February 2003

Netherlands
Coach: Emmerson Trotman

 Ruud Nijman replaced Victor Grandia on 21 January 2003

Pakistan
Coach: Richard Pybus

Zimbabwe
Coach: Geoff Marsh

 Alistair Campbell replaced Mark Vermeulen on 10 March 2003
 Stuart Matsikenyeri replaced Brian Murphy on 10 March 2003

Group B

Bangladesh
Coach:  Mohsin Kamal

 Akram Khan replaced Mashrafe Mortaza on 19 February 2003

Canada
Coach: Gus Logie

Kenya
Coach: Sandeep Patil

New Zealand
Coach: John Bracewell

South Africa
Coach: Eric Simons

 Graeme Smith replaced Jonty Rhodes on 13 February 2003

Sri Lanka
Coach: Dav Whatmore

West Indies
Coach: Roger Harper

 Marlon Samuels was replaced by Ryan Hinds on 29 January 2003, but was reinstated on 8 February 2003

References

External links
2003 World Cup squads – ESPNcricinfo
Squads & Player Profiles – BBC Sport

Squads
Cricket World Cup squads